Koçmarlı is a  village in Tarsus district of Mersin Province, Turkey. Its population was  167 as of 2012. as of 2012.

References

Villages in Tarsus District